Wang Shuhui (born 12 July 1993) is a Chinese team handball player. She plays for the club Jiangsu, and on the Chinese national team. She represented China at the 2013 World Women's Handball Championship in Serbia.

References

Chinese female handball players
1993 births
Living people